Zheng Huaiying also known as Cheng Huai Ying is a female former international table tennis player from China.

Table tennis career
From 1973 to 1975 she won three medals at the World Table Tennis Championships and several medals at the Asian Games and in the Asian Table Tennis Championships.

The three World Championship medals included a gold medals at the singles at the 1975 World Table Tennis Championships in the Corbillon Cup (team event) with Ge Xin'ai, Hu Yulan and Zhang Li for China.

In addition she won a silver medal in the team and bronze medal in the mixed doubles at the 1973 World Table Tennis Championships with Yu Changchun.

See also
 List of table tennis players
 List of World Table Tennis Championships medalists

References

Chinese female table tennis players
Asian Games medalists in table tennis
Table tennis players at the 1974 Asian Games
Medalists at the 1974 Asian Games
Asian Games gold medalists for China
Sportspeople from Fuzhou
Table tennis players from Fujian
20th-century Chinese women